Sergio Andrés Vergara Páez (born April 25, 1994) is a Chilean professional footballer who plays for Curicó Unido.

Honours

Club
Pachuca
 CONCACAF Champions League: 2016–17

External links
Profile at AscensoMX

1994 births
Living people
Chilean footballers
Chilean expatriate footballers
Association football forwards
Atlético Morelia players
Chilean Primera División players
Primera B de Chile players
Liga MX players
Universidad de Chile footballers
Deportes Valdivia footballers
Club Celaya footballers
C.F. Pachuca players
Mineros de Zacatecas players
Everton de Viña del Mar footballers
People from Maule Region
Chilean expatriate sportspeople in Mexico
Expatriate footballers in Mexico